Lasionycta mono is a moth of the family Noctuidae. This species is known only from the type locality in the Sierra Nevada.

The habitat is most likely rocky tundra.

The wingspan is about 26 mm.

External links
A Revision of Lasionycta Aurivillius (Lepidoptera, Noctuidae) for North America and notes on Eurasian species, with descriptions of 17 new species, 6 new subspecies, a new genus, and two new species of Tricholita Grote

Lasionycta
Moths described in 2009